Göran Aral  (born 3 July 1953 in Sweden) is a former Swedish footballer.

Göran Aral was born in 1953 and is a product of the Djurgården youth system. At the beginning of the 1970s he was considered such a promising player that he was selected to go to London and train with Chelsea FC. However, a serious injury ended his career in 1977 at the age of 24.

Aral was most recently with Swedish Allsvenskan side, Djurgården, serving as their Sport Director, overseeing the club's youth initiatives and technical system. He served at Djurgården in a number of capacities and was on the management team since the late 1990s. During this time, Aral was part of  Allsvenskan-winning teams in 2002 and 2003.  In 2004, he left Djurgården to work with the Swedish Football Association and remained there until 2008 when he returned to Djurgården to serve as technical director.

During the 2010 season he was hired by New York Red Bulls to serve as an assistant coach under fellow Swede Hans Backe. He was hired to assist with the first-team and to oversee the club's academy system.  At the end of the 2010 season, Aral left the club and was eventually replaced by Jan Halvor Halvorsen.

References 

Living people
1953 births
Djurgårdens IF Fotboll players
Swedish footballers
Swedish football managers
Djurgårdens IF Fotboll directors and chairmen
New York Red Bulls non-playing staff
Association footballers not categorized by position